BeReal (stylized as BeReal.) is a French social media app released in 2020. It was developed by Alexis Barreyat and Kevin Perreau. After a couple of years of relative obscurity, it rapidly gained popularity in early and mid-2022.

Its main feature is a daily notification that encourages users to share a photo of themselves and their immediate surroundings given a randomly selected two-minute window every day. Critics noted its emphasis on authenticity, which some felt crossed the line into mundanity. The name "BeReal" is a double entendre. Its primary reference relates to its focus on users uploading unpolished photos, while also being a pun of term b-reel.

According to the app's description on Apple's App Store, BeReal encourages its users to "show their friends who they really are, for once," by removing filters and opportunities to stage or edit photos.

History 
The app was developed by Alexis Barreyat, a former employee of GoPro, and Kevin Perreau. Initially released in 2020, it first gained widespread popularity in early 2022. It first spread widely on college campuses, partially due to a paid ambassador program. As of late August 2022, the application has over 10 million active daily users and 21.6 million active monthly users.

In April 2022, BeReal received a $30 million funding round led by Andreessen Horowitz and Accel. In May 2022, BeReal secured $85 million in a funding round led by Yuri Milner's DST Global, increasing its valuation to about $600 million.

Features 
Once per day, BeReal simultaneously notifies all users that a two-minute window to post is open. It asks users to create a post (known eponymously as a "BeReal") which, using mandatory simultaneous photos from both the front and back cameras, provides a visual depiction of what they are doing in that moment. The given window varies from day to day, and is not known to users before the notification is received. 
 
Once the daily notification is sent, users lose the ability to see others' BeReals from the previous day. Furthermore, users cannot see any of the current day's BeReals until they upload their own. While on-time BeReals show the time it was uploaded, late BeReals uploaded after the two-minute window only show how late the poster is. Other users can also see how many attempts the poster took to take the BeReal, as well as their location when the BeReal was taken. Users only get one chance to delete their BeReal and post another one, and they cannot post more than one at any time. BeReal also features a 'Discovery' section, whereby users are given the option to share to a much wider, public audience. This feature, however, is limited, as users are not able to interact with the posts through commenting—unlike the 'My Friends' feature. 

Because of its daily cycle of engagement, it has been compared to Wordle, which gained popularity earlier in 2022. BeReal has been described as designed to compete with Instagram, while simultaneously de-emphasising social media addiction and overuse. The app does not allow any photo filters or other editing, and has no advertising or follower counts. Marketing material from the company warned that the app "can be addictive" but also stated that "BeReal won't make you famous." The app does not have an explicit image moderation process, and thus does not restrict the users from posting inappropriate photos. However, there is a report function that allows users to report a photo or another user if they are posting inappropriate content.

Reception 
Jason Koebler, a writer for Vice, wrote that in contrast to Instagram, which presents an unattainable view of people's lives, BeReal instead "makes everyone look extremely boring." Niklas Myhr, a professor of social media at Chapman University, argued that depth of engagement may determine whether the app is a passing trend or has "staying power." Kelsey Weekman, a reporter for BuzzFeed News, noted that the app's unwillingness to "glamorise the banality of life" made it feel "humbling" in its emphasis on authenticity. Niloufar Haidari for The Guardian comments similarly that where the app succeeds in being "drab" in perhaps a positive way, it fails in potentially "un-inspiring" users.

BeReal is considered to be targeted towards Generation Z users, and attempts to minimize "social media fatigue", a feeling of numbness and disconnection from reality caused by constant interaction with an idealized version of others. However, BeReal's daily two-minute window has been argued to contribute to social media fatigue and a need for self-exposure, as well as constant access to phones.

Some people regularly post after the two-minute notification expires, leading to some criticism of the app, as the ability to post late undermines its aims of authenticity.  

With the popularity of BeReal, other providers have launched similar features. In July 2022 Instagram launched a "Dual Camera" feature similar to BeReal, and in August 2022 began testing a similar feature called "IG Candid Challenges" where users are prompted to post once a day within two minutes. As of September 2022, TikTok has also launched a feature called TikTok Now, following the same concept.

References 

Computer-related introductions in 2020
Image-sharing websites
Internet properties established in 2020
Mobile applications
Mobile social software
Social networking services
Social media companies
Proprietary cross-platform software